St. Mary Church ( `Idto d-Yoldat Aloho), is a Syriac Orthodox church in Diyarbakir. It is under the jurisdiction of the Syriac Archdiocese of Mardin, headed by Metropolitan Mor Filüksinos Saliba Özmen. The church was first constructed as a pagan temple in the 1st century BC, and the current construction dates back to the 3rd century. The church has been restored many times, and is still in use as a place of worship today. The church is open to visitors for a 5 lira entrance fee.

History
When Diyarbakir was known by its Syriac name Amid, it was the seat of some of the Patriarchs of the Assyrian Church of the East  and thus an original Assyrian/Syriac stronghold that produced many famous theologians and Patriarchs. There are many relics in the Church, such as the bones of the apostle Thomas and St. Jacob of Sarug. The church also  has a large and very significant collection of manuscripts.

References

Churches in Diyarbakır
Oriental Orthodoxy in Turkey
Syriac Orthodox churches
1st-century BC religious buildings and structures